ABC News Live (a.k.a. ABCNL) is an American streaming video news channel for breaking news, live events, newscasts, and longer-form reports and documentaries operated by ABC News since 2018.  The channel is available through various streaming device apps such as Roku, Hulu, YouTube TV, Sling TV, Pluto TV, Xumo, FuboTV, Haystack News, Samsung TV Plus, and the news division's other streaming platforms. Justin Dial is the senior executive director of ABC News Live.

History

As ABC News Now 
After having attempted a 20-minute online news program three times a week hosted by Sam Donaldson in 1999, ABC News launched a forerunner of ABC News Now (ABCNN) in March 2003. The service was fee based except for the customers of America Online, Comcast, and a few other Internet providers. Later, mobile phone users could access the programming through Sprint's MobiTV. The ABCNN service launched on July 24, 2004, with extended coverage of the Democratic National Convention and Republican National Convention. It was offered via digital television, broadband and streaming video at ABCNews.com and on mobile phones. It delivered breaking news, headline news each half hour, and a wide range of entertainment and lifestyle programming.

On January 31, 2005, ABC News removed ABCNN from owned and operated and affiliated TV stations' subchannel as the channel ended its experimental phase originally expected to end after election day but extended past inauguration. The channel would continue on the internet and wireless devices. 20/20 senior broadcast producer Mike Clemente was then hired as executive producer to head up the channel as a part of an increasing capacity being developed for the channel to returns a permanent channel in the Spring. The channel was relaunched as a digital terrestrial television network, cable channel, and broadband service in early April 2005.

On November 5, 2007, Disney-ABC International Television announced plans to launch the channel in international territories, including Germany, Spain and Belgium in 2008 on IPTV service Zattoo, with more territories, including the United Kingdom, planned for the next 6 months. This marked the second international channel launched under ABC branding, the first being the United Kingdom general entertainment channel ABC1 which closed on September 26, 2007.

On October 28, 2013, ABC News launched a new cable news channel, Fusion, as a joint venture with Univision and contributing its ABC News Now operations.

As ABC News Live 
With news channels getting high ratings from the 2016 election and ABC News having exited its joint venture news channel, ABCNL launched exclusive on Roku in March 2018 then added to Facebook Watch and ABC apps and websites. Also on October 26, 2018, the channel was added to Hulu with Live TV followed by Hulu streaming on March 20, 2020.

On April 21, 2020, ABCNL launched on YouTube TV and Amazon's news app on Fire TV.

On January 23, 2020, ABC News announced an expansion of staffing for the streaming channel and changes in programming to add newscasts and long form reports and documentaries being roll out over a month's time. Justin Dial, formerly of Vice News Tonight, was hired as senior executive producer of ABCNL. Tom Llamas would anchor breaking news coverage at the time of the Iowa caucuses, while Linsey Davis would anchor two weekday one-hour evening newscasts. ABC News planned as of March 2020 that ABCNL would air 18 hours of programming daily.

Programming

Current Programming

As ABC News Live 

 ABC News Live, six weekday 30-minute daytime newscasts hosted by Diane Macedo, Kyra Phillips, and Terry Moran.
 ABC News Live Prime, two weekday 90-minute evening newscasts hosted by Linsey Davis (February 2020-)
 ABC World News Now, a daily half-hour early morning newscast 
 GMA3: What You Need to Know, a weekday, hour-long daytime news program on ABC. It premiered in March 2020 as Pandemic: What You Need To Know, as a temporary replacement for its talk show Strahan, Sara and Keke to cover the onset of the COVID-19 pandemic in the United States. It has since replaced it indefinitely. The program is anchored by Amy Robach and GMA correspondent T. J. Holmes. In 2022, Stephanie Ramos and Gio Benitez became interim replacements the two after an affair allegation.
 ABC World News Tonight, a rebroadcast of the ABC news program hosted by David Muir on weekdays, Whit Johnson on Saturdays, and Linsey Davis on Sundays. Nielsen ranks the show as the most watched evening news program on American television since 2016.
 What Would You Do?, a hidden camera show, weekend rebroadcasts started in 2022 hosted John Quiñones
 The View, an all-women talk and viewpoints show that airs middays on ABC anchored by Whoopi Goldberg, Sara Haines, Joy Behar, Sunny Hostin, Ana Navarro, and Alyssa Farah Griffin
 20/20, a weekly hour-long true crime program hosted by Amy Robach and David Muir.
 Nightline, an hour-long late night news program that normally airs weeknights on ABC after Jimmy Kimmel Live!. Hosted on rotation by Byron Pitts and Juju Chang

Former Programming

As ABC News Now 
Tech This Out!—Technology news and a consumer guide to gadgets, hosted by Daniel Sieberg.
Good Morning America Health—GMA Health is a third hour of Good Morning America and also is themed toward health news and other health-related topics, airing 2pm/ET. Its predecessor was Good Morning America Now which was canceled due to lack of viewers. Its final broadcast was October 2008.
Inside the Newsroom—2x times daily.
Money Matters—Financial and economic news and tips right after the NYSE opening bell.
Good Money—Personal finance information for everyday consumers and small business owners.
The Daily Download—feature stories, viral videos and stories from off the beaten path.
Popcorn with Peter Travers—An interview-based movie show, with stars talking to Rolling Stone movie reviewer Peter Travers.
Amplified—Indie music and interviews, brought to you by ABC News anchor Dan Harris.
TopLine—Inside the political arena with Rick Klein.
What's the Buzz—celebrity entertainment news.
World Piece — featured one international news story
World View—Round-up of headlines from around the world.
Now You Know—Living Advice and News Briefs along with Weather, Now You Know was ABC News Now's morning program.
Chef's Table

As ABC News Live 
Around the Table (September 10, 2019 -?) - an irregular presidential candidate interview program in which Democratic candidates are interviewed by three voters and moderated by anchors and correspondents around a table. Episodes would be used as a part of that night's Nightline. In the first episode, Byron Pitts moderates Beto O’Rourke with the second episode being Linsey Davis moderating Senator Cory Booker.
 Guardians of the Amazon (February 2020) - a documentary regarding rainforest destruction, produced by the Nightline team.

References

Now
Television channels and stations established in 2004
Television channels and stations established in 2018
Television networks in the United States
Internet properties established in 2018
Internet television channels
24-hour television news channels in the United States